Ivaylo Stoyanov (born 15 October 1969), better known as Marius Kurkinski (Мариус Куркински), is a Bulgarian actor, director, film writer and pop singer. He wrote, directed and starred in the 1996 Bulgarian film Dnevnikat Na Edin Lud (The Diary of a Madman).

Kurkinski has built a reputation both in Bulgaria and abroad for his one-man shows such as "The Lady with the Dog” and "The Lone Man". He won the award Europe's Actor in the International Monodrama Festival in Oteševo, Republic of Macedonia for his performance of "The Dream" by Julian Barnes in 2003. Later that year, he won the Apolonia Award at the Apollonia Festival held in Sozopol, Bulgaria. In honour of the awards, he was invited to participate in World Theatre Day on March 27, 2004 held in Paris, France.

He is openly gay.

Filmography
 Sirna Nedelya ( A Day of Forgiveness 1993)
 La Donna e Mobile (1993)
 Granitza (a.k.a. The Border 1994)
 Dnevnikat Na Edin Lud (a.k.a. Diary of a Madman 1996)
 Pryatelite na Emiliya (a.k.a. Emilia's Friends 1996)
 Vsichko Ot Nula (a.k.a. Starting From the Scratch 1996)
 Ad Libitum 4 Variatzii Na Graf dyo Burbulon (a.k.a. Ad Libitum: Variations of Count de Bourboulon 2000)
 Posseteni ot Gosspoda (a.k.a. Meme Dieu est venu nous voir released in Bulgaria 2001 and in France 2003)
 Opashkata na Dyavola (a.k.a. Devil's Tail 2001)
 Zasukan Sviat (a.k.a. A Twisted World 2019)

References

External links
 
 Story on winning of Europe award
 Sofia News Agency Report about his participation in World Theatre Day in Paris
 MySpace-Marius Kurkinski-FAN SITE MySpace music profile for Marius Kurkinski-FAN SITE with tour dates, songs, videos, pictures, blogs, band information, downloads and more

1969 births
Living people
Bulgarian male film actors
Bulgarian male stage actors
Bulgarian LGBT actors
Gay actors
LGBT theatre directors
Bulgarian LGBT musicians
LGBT Christians
Bulgarian theatre directors
Bulgarian pop singers
20th-century Bulgarian male singers
People from Novi Pazar, Bulgaria